Stefania Boffa (born 9 August 1988) is a former tennis player from Switzerland. She has a career-high singles ranking of 307, and a doubles ranking of 194. She played for the Swiss Fed Cup team once in 2006, and retired from tennis 2010.

ITF Circuit finals

Singles: 5 (1 title, 4 runner-ups)

Doubles: 12 (4 titles, 8 runner-ups)

References

External links
 
 
 

Swiss female tennis players
1988 births
Living people
Place of birth missing (living people)
20th-century Swiss women
21st-century Swiss women